Hans Yost Creek is a tributary of Deep Creek in Schuylkill County, Pennsylvania, in the United States. The creek is designated as an impaired waterbody, with the causes being metals and pH and the probable source being abandoned mine drainage. It has no named tributaries, but two abandoned mine discharges flow into it. The creek's watershed was extensively mined in the late 1800s and early 1900s, but the only remaining active mining permits are for remining.

Course
Hans Yost Creek begins in a large valley in Foster Township. It flows in a westerly direction through the valley for several tenths of a mile, entering Barry Township. The creek then turns southwest for a short distance before turning west. After a few tenths of a mile, it turns southwest for several tenths of a mile, entering a much narrower valley. The creek eventually turns in a westerly direction for several tenths of a milebriefly turning northwest and then southwest along the waybefore reaching the end of its valley and turning northwest. A short distance further downstream, the creek reaches its confluence with Deep Creek.

Tributaries
Hans Yost Creek has no named tributaries, nor are any tributaries visible on the United States Geological Survey map of the Tremont quadrangle. However, a few small intermittent streams do flow into the creek's headwaters.

Hydrology
Hans Yost Creek is designated as an impaired waterbody for its entire length. The causes of the impairment are metals and pH and the probable source of impairment is abandoned mine drainage. There are two abandoned mine discharges in the creek's watershed. One is known as the Moser Mine Pool Discharge and enters the creek in its upper reaches. The estimated flow of this discharge is 0.259 million gallons per day. The other is known locally as Rattling Run and is formed from the Collapsed Tunnel Discharge and the Buck Mountain Vein Overflow Discharge. This discharge enters the creek in its lower reaches.

The average discharge of Hans Yost Creek above the Moser Discharge has been estimated to be 0.259 million gallons per day, while below the discharge, it has been estimated at 0.518 million gallons per day. Above the Rattling Run discharge, the creek's discharge was found to average at 1.49 million gallons per day, while below the discharge, it was 3.59 million gallons per day.

Geography, geology, and watershed

Part of a steep valley between Broad Mountain and Mahantango Mountain is drained by Hans Yost Creek. The creek flows through the Southern Anthracite Coal Field.

The creek is entirely within the United States Geological Survey quadrangle of Tremont. Its mouth is located within  of Weishample.

The headwaters of Hans Yost Creek flow through forested land and are difficult to access.

Pennsylvania Route 901 and Interstate 81 are partially in the vicinity of the creek's watershed.

History
Hans Yost Creek was entered into the Geographic Names Information System on August 2, 1979. Its identifier in the Geographic Names Information System is 1176486. The creek is also known as Hanyost Creek. This variant name appears in a Pennsylvania Department of Transportation map of Schuylkill County dating to 1975.

The watershed of Hans Yost Creek experienced extensive mining during the late 1800s and early 1900s. There are still active mining permits in the watershed, as of 2001. However, they are remining permits and thus do not involve discharges into the creek. In 1976, the Schuylkill County Sportsmen's Association began a drive to construct a fish nursery with a capacity for 30,000 trout on the creek. This was despite the M.S.W. Coal Company proposing to mine at the headwaters of Deep Creek and discharge treated water into the watershed of Hans Yost Creek; the Schuylkill County Sportsmen's Association opted to believe that the coal mining operation would not pollute anything.

At least two biological studies have been conducted on Hans Yost Creek. In 1972, the Pennsylvania Department of Environmental Resources found the macroinvertebrate community to be satisfactory. However, in 1997, a study by the Pennsylvania Department of Environmental Protection found the creek to be impaired. The Tri-Valley Watershed Association, which operates in the watersheds of Deep Creek, Pine Creek, and Mahantango Creek, has dosed the Moser Mine Pool Discharge with limestone to increase the creek's alkalinity. Treatment for the lower reaches of Hans Yost Creek are also being considered by the Tri-Valley Watershed Association.

Biology
The drainage basin of Hans Yost Creek is classified as a Coldwater Fishery. The designated use for Hans Yost Creek is aquatic life.

In the 1970s, Hans Yost Creek was found to have "good stream conditions", with the abandoned mine drainage discharges causing little or no impact to the macroinvertebrate community in the creek.

See also
List of rivers of Pennsylvania

References

Rivers of Schuylkill County, Pennsylvania
Tributaries of Mahantango Creek
Rivers of Pennsylvania